The 2015 Spanish local elections were held on Sunday, 24 May 2015, to elect all 67,515 councillors in the 8,122 municipalities of Spain and all 1,040 seats in 38 provincial deputations. The elections were held simultaneously with regional elections in thirteen autonomous communities, as well as elections in the three foral deputations of the Basque Country, the four island councils in the Balearic Islands and the seven island cabildos in the Canary Islands.

Electoral system

Background
After Podemos' success in the 2014 European Parliament election, the party decided not to directly contest the local elections scheduled for May 2015 to focus on the regional and general elections to be held throughout that year. Instead, they opted for the Guanyem Barcelona formula, popular unity municipal candidacies comprising different parties and social movements. The model was reproduced in many cities under the name Ganemos (Let's Win).

United Left (IU), the traditional left-wing third party of Spain, also started debating whether to join these local coalitions. However, this option was not well received by some party sectors, particularly their Madrid branch, who feared that the party would lose its identity if it joined these coalitions. The first attempt at a joint candidacy that included Podemos and United Left, among others, succeeded in Barcelona with Guanyem Barcelona, later Barcelona en Comú, under activist Ada Colau's leadership.

Another national party that decided to participate in most of these unitary candidacies was Equo, as well as minoritary parties like For a Fairer World (PUM+J), Building the Left–Socialist Alternative (CLI–AS), Republican Alternative (ALTER), Renewal–Nationalist Brotherhood (Anova), or Initiative for Catalonia Greens (ICV). The unitary lists also included individuals from social movements like the anti-eviction PAH, 15M, o the so-called mareas (Spanish for "tides") made up of workers from different service sectors like teachers, Public Health System workers or young people forced to migrate as a consequence of the 2008–15 Spanish financial crisis.

Municipal elections
Municipalities in Spain were local corporations with independent legal personality. They had a governing body, the municipal council or corporation, composed of the mayor, the government council and the elected plenary assembly. Elections to the local councils in Spain were fixed for the fourth Sunday of May every four years.

Voting for the local assemblies was on the basis of universal suffrage, which comprised all nationals over 18 years of age, registered and residing in the corresponding municipality and in full enjoyment of their political rights, as well as resident non-national European citizens and those whose country of origin allowed Spanish nationals to vote in their own elections by virtue of a treaty. Local councillors were elected using the D'Hondt method and a closed list proportional representation, with an electoral threshold of five percent of valid votes—which included blank ballots—being applied in each local council. Parties not reaching the threshold were not taken into consideration for seat distribution. Councillors were allocated to municipal councils based on the following scale:

Councillors of municipalities with populations below 250 inhabitants were elected under an open list partial block voting, with electors voting for individual candidates instead of parties: for up to four candidates in municipalities with populations between 100 and 250 inhabitants; and for up to two candidates in municipalities below 100. This did not apply to municipalities which, as a result of their geographical location or the convenience of a better management of municipal interests or other circumstances, made it advisable to be organized through the open council system, in which voters would directly elect the local major.

The mayor was indirectly elected by the plenary assembly. A legal clause required that mayoral candidates earn the vote of an absolute majority of councillors, or else the candidate of the most-voted party in the assembly was to be automatically appointed to the post. In the event of a tie, a toss-up would determine the appointee.

The electoral law allowed for parties and federations registered in the interior ministry, coalitions and groupings of electors to present lists of candidates. Parties and federations intending to form a coalition ahead of an election were required to inform the relevant Electoral Commission within ten days of the election call, whereas groupings of electors needed to secure the signature of a determined amount of the electors registered in the municipality for which they sought election:

At least one percent of the electors in municipalities with a population below 5,000 inhabitants, provided that the number of signers was more than double that of councillors at stake.
At least 100 signatures in municipalities with a population between 5,001 and 10,000.
At least 500 signatures in municipalities with a population between 10,001 and 50,000.
At least 1,500 signatures in municipalities with a population between 50,001 and 150,000.
At least 3,000 signatures in municipalities with a population between 150,001 and 300,000.
At least 5,000 signatures in municipalities with a population between 300,001 and 1,000,000.
At least 8,000 signatures in municipalities with a population over 1,000,001.

Electors were disallowed from signing for more than one list of candidates.

Deputations and island councils
Provincial deputations were the governing bodies of provinces in Spain, having an administration role of municipal activities and composed of a provincial president, an administrative body, and a plenary. Basque provinces had foral deputations instead—called Juntas Generales—, whereas deputations for single-province autonomous communities were abolished and their functions transferred to the corresponding regional parliaments in 1982–1983. For insular provinces, such as the Balearic and Canary Islands, deputations were replaced by island councils in each of the islands or group of islands. For Majorca, Menorca, Ibiza and Formentera this figure was referred to in Spanish as consejo insular, whereas for Gran Canaria, Tenerife, Fuerteventura, La Gomera, El Hierro, Lanzarote and La Palma its name was cabildo insular.

Most deputations were indirectly elected by local councillors from municipalities in each judicial district. Seats were allocated to provincial deputations based on the following scale:

Island councils and foral deputations were elected directly by electors under their own, specific electoral regulations.

Opinion polls

Municipal elections

Overall

City control
The following table lists party control in provincial capitals, as well as in municipalities with a population above or around 75,000. Gains for a party are highlighted in that party's colour.

Deputation control
The following table lists party control in provincial deputations. Gains for a party are highlighted in that party's colour.

References

2015